Howard Paul Donald (born 28 April 1968) is an English singer, songwriter, drummer, pianist, dancer and record producer. He is a member of English pop-group Take That. Donald was also judge on the German reality talent show Got to Dance from 2013 to 2014, during a Take That-hiatus.

Early life
Donald was educated at Littlemoss High School in Droylsden, gaining no GCSEs, and trained for three years as a vehicle painter, on the Youth Training Scheme (YTS).

A budding DJ, his musical interests were largely informed by his brother Colin's vinyl collection, and included electronic acts such as Kraftwerk, John Foxx, Orchestral Manoeuvres in the Dark (OMD) and Gary Numan. As a teenager Donald became interested in dancing and frequented the burgeoning breakdancing circuit in the Greater Manchester area, where he would first come into contact with future bandmate Jason Orange. He auditioned for Nigel Martin-Smith's new boy band project at his office in Manchester and was selected. The group was eventually named Take That.

Career
Nigel Martin-Smith recruited Donald, along with Gary Barlow, Jason Orange, Mark Owen and Robbie Williams to form a British boyband, Take That. The band enjoyed five years of success until Williams left in 1995, leaving them to carry on as a quartet. Along with Orange, Donald featured less on lead vocals than Barlow, Owen and Williams during the band's first era, however did sing lead vocal on the single "Never Forget", which reached No. 1 in the UK in 1995.

In early 1996, Donald's bandmates Barlow, Owen and Orange came to the difficult decision that Take That was to split. They told Donald, who was not happy, but went along with their decision. Following the split, Donald attempted a solo career, recording an unreleased single, "Speak Without Words", and returned to DJing. In the 2005 documentary Take That: For the Record, Donald confessed to being unstable enough to have the intention of committing suicide by drowning himself in the River Thames, not long after the split.

In 2005, Take That reformed and announced a reunion tour, The Ultimate Tour in the summer of 2006, following the release of their Greatest Hits album, Never Forget: The Ultimate Collection. The tour was followed in late 2006 by their first studio album since 1995, Beautiful World, and from it they achieved two number ones in "Patience" and "Shine". Beautiful World featured Donald on lead vocals on two tracks; "Beautiful World" and "Mancunian Way". The song "Mancunian Way" is a tribute to the band's hometown of Manchester.

On the 2008 Take That album The Circus, Donald sang lead on two tracks, "What Is Love" and "Here". He also shared lead vocals with the rest of the band on the album's opening track, "The Garden".

On the 2010 Take That album Progress, Donald sang lead vocals on the track "Affirmation". He also played drums on several songs on the Progress album and mixed a B-side track for the second single "Kidz" called "Revenge of the Kidz".

On the 2017 Take That album Wonderland, Donald sang lead vocals on "Every Revolution".

In 2021, Donald appeared on The Masked Dancer, masked as Zip. He reached the final and was unmasked in third place.

Tours with Take That
 Party Tour (1992–93)
 Everything Changes Tour (1993–94)
 Pops Tour (1994–95)
 Nobody Else Tour (1995)
 The Ultimate Tour (2006)
 Beautiful World Tour 2007 (2007)
 Take That Present: The Circus Live (2009)
 Progress Live (2011)
 Take That Live (2015)
 Wonderland Live (2017)
 Greatest Hits Live (2019)

Lead vocal (Take That)
"If This Is Love" (also songwriter)
"Never Forget"
"Beautiful World"
"Mancunian Way"
"What Is Love"
"Here"
"Affirmation"
"Aliens"
"Give You My Love"
"I Like It"
"Hey Boy"
"Every Revolution"
"Spin"

Discography

Only Single as a solo artist 
 Speak Without Words (unreleased, 1996)

Studio albums with Take That 

 Take That & Party (1992)
 Everything Changes (1993)
 Nobody Else (1995)
 Beautiful World (2006)
 The Circus (2008)
 Progress (2010)
 Progressed (2011)
 III (2014)
 Wonderland (2017)
 Odyssey (2018)

Got to Dance
Donald was one of the judges on a dancing show Got to Dance in Germany from 2013 to 2014.

Health problems
During the Beautiful World Tour in 2007, Donald suffered a collapsed lung after performing a series of gymnastic stunts on stage, and was kept on a hospital ward for the two days, while the rest of the band performed as a threesome. However, Donald recovered quickly enough to reunite with the band in the final leg of the tour.

Personal life
Donald was educated at Moorside Primary School and Littlemoss High School.

Since January 2015, Donald has been married to illustrator Katie Halil. A spokesperson for him said "I can confirm Howard Donald and Katie Halil were married at a private ceremony for close family and friends on 2 January."

He is the father of two daughters from two previous relationships, Grace (born June 1999) and Lola (born February 2005). Grace was born to Victoria Piddington, while he had his younger daughter from his relationship with Marie-Christine Musswessels. He also has two sons, Bowie Taylan (born January 2016) and Dougie Bear (born February 2017), with his wife Katie Halil.

In April 2010, Donald was granted a super-injunction against former girlfriend, musician Adakini Ntuli, with whom he had been in an on/off relationship from 2000 to 2008. (See Ntuli v Donald) After Ntuli engaged publicist Max Clifford and began negotiations with the News of the World, Donald obtained the super-injunction. The non-publicity side of the injunction was lifted in November 2010.

In 2007, he expressed his view that cannabis should be legalised, saying, "If more people went out stoned than drunk I think there would be less fighting, less trouble, and less violence." He admitted to having "dabbled with ecstasy" in the past.

In June 2012, it was revealed that along with Take That bandmates Gary Barlow and Mark Owen, Donald had invested £26 million in music industry investment schemes. The news attracted controversy when it was understood that the schemes could serve as tax shelters for high-net-worth people. Lawyers responded to the claims, stating the band members "paid significant tax, and that they believed the schemes were not for tax avoidance purposes but were legitimate commercial enterprises." In an interview with BBC Radio in 2020, Paul Stenning, who worked for the band in 1995 under their financial advisor Simon Orange, explained the way the band's finances were structured, saying they were "meticulously disseminated".

References

1968 births
Living people
English male singers
English songwriters
English DJs
English expatriates in Germany
Take That members
People from Droylsden
Musicians from Greater Manchester
Ivor Novello Award winners